Justine Clark is an architectural editor, writer, speaker and researcher, based in Melbourne, Australia. She is the editor of Parlour, a former editor of Architecture Australia, and co-author of Looking for the Local: Architecture and the New Zealand Modern.

Education 
Born in New Zealand, Clark completed her bachelor's degree with honours in architecture at the University of Auckland and her master's degree by research with distinction in architecture at Victoria University of Wellington.  She currently resides in Melbourne, Australia.

Career 
After completing her education, Clark was the 1998 National Library Research Fellow at the Alexander Turnbull Library, which resulted in the publication of the book Looking for the Local: Architecture and the New Zealand Modern, co-authored with Paul Walker, and accompanying exhibition.

Clark was the editor of Architecture Australia, the magazine of the Australian Institute of Architects, from 2003 to 2011.  She was a collaborator on the Australia Research Council (ARC) linkage grant funded project "Equity and Diversity in the Australian Architecture Profession: Women, Work, and Leadership", led by Dr Naomi Stead.  Her involvement in this project lead to her position as founding editor of the online publication Parlour: Women, Equity, Architecture, which began as a repository for the ARC research and is now an ongoing platform for the dissemination of research on gender, equity and architecture.

She has reviewed architecture for The Age newspaper and curates exhibitions. In addition to her work for Parlour she is a member the Office of the Victorian Government Architect's Design Review Panel and the South Australian Office for Design and Architecture's Design Review Panel. Justine is an honorary research fellow at the Faculty of Architecture, Building and Planning at the University of Melbourne.

Clark was awarded the 2019 President’s Prize by the Victorian chapter of the Australian Institute of Architects, in recognition of outstanding contribution towards the profession.

Selected publications

Selected exhibitions 
1996 Cuttings from the Centre, City Gallery, Wellington. Co-curator and co-designer with Sharon Jansen.

2000 Looking for the Local, an exhibition at the Adam Art Gallery, Victoria University of Wellington. Co-designer and co-curator with Paul Walker.

2015 Portraits of Practice, Tin Sheds Gallery, University of Sydney. Co-curator and co-designer with Naomi Stead, Maryam Gusheh, Gill Matthewson and Fiona Young.

Awards 

 Victorian Institute of Architects, Bates Smart Award for Architecture in the Media (2009) - for Architecture Australia's special issue on Indigenous Housing.
 Victorian Institute of Architects, Bates Smart Award for Architecture in the Media (2011) - for her contribution to architectural discourse through the architectural publication Architecture Australia
 Victorian Institute of Architects, Bates Smart Award for Architecture in the Media (2013) - for her contribution to Parlour
 Munro Diversity Award (2014), with Gill Matthewson.
 Victorian Institute of Architects, Bates Smart Award for Architecture in the Media (2015) - for her contribution to the Parlour Guides to Equitable Practice
 Marion Mahony Griffin Prize (2015).
 Victorian Institute of Architects 2019 President’s Prize.

References 

Living people
University of Auckland alumni
Victoria University of Wellington alumni
Architects from Melbourne
Australian women architects
Australian architecture writers
New Zealand architecture writers
New Zealand women architects
Architecture critics
Year of birth missing (living people)